Santiago is an unincorporated community in Santiago Township, Sherburne County, Minnesota, United States, near the junction of Sherburne County Roads 3 and 11. The St. Francis River flows through the community.

Geography
Sherburne County Roads 16 and 23 are also in the immediate area, as is the Sherburne National Wildlife Refuge.

Nearby towns include Clear Lake, Foley, Princeton, and St. Cloud. Santiago is 12 miles north of Becker, and 26 miles north-northwest of Elk River.

History
Santiago was platted in 1857. A post office called Santiago operated between 1858 and 1985.

References

Unincorporated communities in Minnesota
Unincorporated communities in Sherburne County, Minnesota
1857 establishments in Minnesota Territory
Populated places established in 1857